The  is a river in Yamagata Prefecture, Japan.

Description and history
It is 224 km long and has a watershed of 7,040 km2. It is regarded as one of the three most rapid rivers of Japan (along with the Fuji River and the Kuma River).

The river rises from southern Yamagata Prefecture and flows to the north, and turns west at Shinjō and flows into the Sea of Japan at Sakata. Water transportation once flourished on the river and carried local products such as safflowers and rice to the Kansai region.

Cultural references
The Mogami River appears as an utamakura in Japanese poetry, with the influential 17th-century poet Matsuo Bashō composing several hokku regarding the river during his travels alongside it.
Some were revised as haiku in the memoir of his journeys, including this well-known poem: 

samidare o atsumete hayashi Mogami-gawa

gathering the rains
of the wet season — swift
the Mogami River
(trans. Shirane)

The character Yūko Aioi in Nichijou has inner monologues in haiku form, all ending with the name of the river as a complete non sequitur (as she cannot think of a full 5-7-5 haiku).

Mogami-gawa is also the name of the anthem of Yamagata Prefecture written by Emperor Hirohito. The Japanese Navy had two different cruisers named Mogami.

Images

References

External links
 (mouth)

Rivers of Yamagata Prefecture
Rivers of Japan